The Original Pinettes Brass Band are a New Orleans brass band. Consisting entirely of women, they are the city's only all-female brass band.

The band was founded in 1991 at St. Mary's Academy (New Orleans), a Catholic girls' school. Taking direction from band director Jeffery C. Herbert, they began playing New Orleans-style jazz. He dubbed the band the Pinettes Brass Band, a feminization of the name of his own band, the Original Pinstripe Brass Band.

At the school's spring concert in 1992, the band played the song "Freedom" by the Rebirth Brass Band and the crowd response led the musicians more toward contemporary brass band music rather than traditional New Orleans jazz.

For the 1993-94 school year, Herbert left St. Mary's to direct the band at John McDonogh High School, but he continued to manage the Pinettes, even after they graduated from St. Mary's. In 1998, he left New Orleans to become assistant band director at Southern University in Baton Rouge, at which point management was turned over to the band members. During this period, the Pinettes played in second line (parades) and released a cassette tape, which garnered them little success outside New Orleans.

The Pinettes have had much turnover in membership over the years. When Hurricane Katrina struck New Orleans on August 29, 2005, band members were forced to relocate. When they began to return to the city, bandleader Christie Jourdain took leadership of the band and made an effort to recruit new band members because some members were unable or unwilling to come back to New Orleans. After a dispute with some of the former band members, they changed their name to "The Original Pinettes Brass Band."

In 2013, after twenty-two years as a band, the Pinettes released their debut full-length CD titled Finally. They hold a popular Friday-night residency at Bullet's Sports Bar in the Seventh Ward.

Red Bull Street Kings competition

In October 2013, the Original Pinettes Brass Band won the Red Bull Street Kings competition. Facing three other prominent New Orleans brass bands, the Pinettes not only won the title, but changed it to "Street Queens."

Residency at Bullet's Sports Bar

Since 2014, band has held a popular Friday night residency at Bullet's Sports Bar in New Orleans's Seventh Ward neighborhood.

References

Further reading
 Kyle DeCoste, Street Queens: New Orleans Brass Bands and the Problem of Intersectionality (2017. Online)
 Kyle DeCoste, Street Queens: The Original Pinettes and Black Feminism in New Orleans Brass Bands (2015. Online)
Matt Sakakeeny, Roll With It: Brass Bands in the Streets of New Orleans (Duke University Press, 2013)
John Swenson, The Original Pinettes Brass Band: Brass-Pop (2012. Online)
Sherrie Tucker, A Feminist Perspective on New Orleans Jazz Women (2004. Online)

Brass bands from New Orleans
Women's musical groups
Women in Louisiana